Albert Thompson (born 15 February 1952) is an Irish sports shooter. He competed in the mixed skeet event at the 1980 Summer Olympics.

References

External links
 

1952 births
Living people
Irish male sport shooters
Olympic shooters of Ireland
Shooters at the 1980 Summer Olympics
Shooters at the 1984 Summer Olympics
Sportspeople from Lisburn
20th-century Irish people